The 2005 FIS Ski Jumping Grand Prix was the 12th Summer Grand Prix season in ski jumping on plastic. Season began on 6 August 2005 in Hinterzarten, Germany and ended on 11 September 2005 in Hakuba. 

Other competitive circuits this season included the World Cup and Continental Cup.

Calendar

Men

Men's team

Standings

Overall

Nations Cup

References

Grand Prix
FIS Grand Prix Ski Jumping